T. Krishnanunni is a sound designer in India. He has received multiple National Film Awards and Kerala State Film Awards. He has worked with almost all the eminent film makers in Kerala, including Adoor Gopalakrishnan, G. Aravindan and Shaji N. Karun.

Biography
T Krishnanunni was born in 1960 in Ottapalam Graduated in Physics from St.Joseph’s College, Devagiri, Kozhikode  under the University of Kerala.  Joined the Film and Television Institute of India, Pune for the Sound Recording & Sound Engineering course.  Passed out from the FTII in 1976. He joined the Space Applications Centre in Ahmedabad as sound recordist in their Khedda Communications Project in 1977. Left Ahmedabad in 1980 to join Chitranjali Studio under the  Kerala State Film Development Corporation in Trivandrum as sound recordist.

Career in sound design

Worked for twenty eight years in Chirtranjali Studio and was the Chief Sound Engineer on retirement in June, 2008. Presently freelancing in sound designing and short film making. During the career in the Chitranjali  Studio, received  President’s awards thrice for Audiography for films Anantharam directed by Sri Adoor Gopalakrishnan, Piravi directed by Sri Shaji .N.Karun  and Desadanam directed by Sri Jayaraj. Have also received nine awards for audiography from the government of Kerala. The last one was for the film "Oru Pennum Randanum" directed by Sri Adoor Gopalakrishan, in  2008. Received the President’s award for the best director for a biographical documentary onVaidya Ratnam P.S.Warrier produced by Kerala State Film Development Corporation, Trivandrum, for the Public Relations Department  in  2005. Have done sound design for films like "KuttySrank " by Shaji N Karun and "Bhoomiyute Avakasikal" by T. V .Chandran. Recently worked as sound designer  for the film "Swapanam " directed by Shaji N Karun and "Oralpokkam " directed by Sanal Kumar Sasidharan

Career in direction
Have directed several documentaries for the Information and Public Relations Department,Government of Kerala, a documentary for the Archaeology Department,  Government of Kerala and  a series of documentaries  for the Kottakkal Arya Vaidya Sala, Kottakkal, Malapuram.

As an author
Authored a book called "Sound in Moving Pictures" published by Mathrubhumi Publications, Kozhikode, Kerala in December 2010.

Awards and accolades

National Film Award for Best Audiographys:

 1987 - National Film Award for Best Audiography - Anantaram 
 1988 - National Film Award for Best Audiography - Piravi
 1996 - National Film Award for Best Audiography - Desadanam

Kerala State Film Awards:

 1987 - Kerala State Film Award for Best Sound Recordist - Purusharam
 1989 - Kerala State Film Award for Best Sound Recordist 
 1994 - Kerala State Film Award for Best Sound Recordist - Swam
 1995 - Kerala State Film Award for Best Sound Recordist - Kazhakam, Ormakalundayirikkanam
 1996 - Kerala State Film Award for Best Sound Recordist - Desadanam
 1997 - Kerala State Film Award for Best Sound Recordist - Janmadinam
 1998 - Kerala State Film Award for Best Sound Recordist - Agnisakshi
 2007 - Kerala State Film Award for Best Sound Recordist - Ottakkayyan
 2008 - Kerala State Film Award for Best Sound Recordist - Oru Pennum Randaanum

References

External links
 

20th-century Indian film directors
Living people
Film and Television Institute of India alumni
Kerala State Film Award winners
1960 births
Film directors from Thiruvananthapuram
Indian documentary filmmakers